Falkanger is a Norwegian surname. Notable people with the surname include:

Aage Thor Falkanger (born 1965), Norwegian judge and legal scholar
Aage Thor Falkanger, Sr. (1902–1981), Norwegian judge
Thor Falkanger (born 1934), Norwegian legal scholar
Torbjørn Falkanger (1927–2013), Norwegian ski jumper

Norwegian-language surnames